McAloon is a surname. Notable people with the surname include:

Gerry McAloon (1916–1987), Scottish footballer
Karen McAloon (born 1968), American interior designer
Paddy McAloon (born 1957), English singer-songwriter
Sean McAloon (1923–1998), Irish piper and pipe maker

Surnames of Irish origin